A total lunar eclipse will take place on October 30, 2050.

This will be the second lunar eclipse in the 2050-2051 tetrad. Taking place near perigee, the Moon's apparent diameter will be larger.

Visibility

Related lunar eclipses

Lunar year series

Half-Saros cycle
A lunar eclipse will be preceded and followed by solar eclipses by 9 years and 5.5 days (a half saros). This lunar eclipse is related to two annular solar eclipses of Solar Saros 134.

Saros series

See also
List of lunar eclipses and List of 21st-century lunar eclipses

Notes

External links

2050-10
2050-10
2050 in science